Van Amersfoort Racing is an auto racing team based in the Netherlands. In 2022 the team competes in the Formula 2 Championship, the Formula 3 Championship, the Formula Regional European Championship, Euroformula Open Championship, Italian F4 Championship and the German ADAC Formula 4 Championship.

Notable past drivers for the team include Max Verstappen, Charles Leclerc, Anthoine Hubert, Callum Ilott, Mick Schumacher, Giedo van der Garde, Jos Verstappen, Christijan Albers, Richie Stanaway, Marcel Albers, Tom Coronel, Renger van der Zande, Joey Alders, Dennis Hauger and Franco Colapinto.

History

First steps (1975-1996)
The team was formed in 1975 by Frits van Amersfoort. They competed in such series as Formula Opel Lotus Benelux, Opel Lotus Euroseries and Dutch Formula Ford. In 1989 they reached their first major success, winning Formula Ford 1600 Netherlands championship with Marcel Albers. In 1992 they won Formula Opel Lotus Benelux with Jos Verstappen.

German Formula Three Championship (1997-2002)
In 1997 the team bought their first Formula Three car with Opel engine to compete in the 1997 German Formula Three Championship with Bas Leinders. The team collected three podiums and Leinders finished season seventh. For the next year the team expanded to two cars, keeping Leinders and signing Christijan Albers Both drivers won nine from 20 races, with Leinders taking the first Formula 3 championship title for the team.

In 1999 the team raced with Thomas Mutsch, Etienne van der Linde and Jacky van der Ende. Mutsch was the only driver who finished a race in the podium podiums. For the next season the team once again completely changed their line-up, racing with Tom van Bavel and Jeroen Bleekemolen.

The team did not have a consistent line-up in 2001; it was the first season for the team when none of the drivers (Marc Caldonazzi, André Fibier, Allan Simonsen and Marco du Pau) scored a podium position. The same situation repeated in 2002

Formula Renault Netherlands (2003-2005)
After the merging of German and French Formula Three championships into the Formula 3 Euro Series, the team decided to switch to Formula Renault 2.0 Netherlands in 2003. Junior Strous and Giedo van der Garde finished the season as runner-up and fourth and had six and seven podiums respectively. For the next season the team signed Carlo van Dam and Renger van der Zande, who finished fifth and seventh respectively. For the last season of the series the team retain van der Zande and signed Récardo Bruins Choi with Dominick Muermans. It was the most successful season in the series with van der Zande claiming the drivers' title, and Bruins Choi taking the third place in the driver standings. While the team took the teams' title.

Return into the German Formula Three Championship (2006-2012)
In 2006 Van Amersfoort Racing returned to the German Formula Three Championship] continuing collaboration with Bruins Choi and Muermans. Bruins Choi took his first Formula Three podium in the series finale at Oschersleben. Following the merging of the Dutch Formula Renault championship to the Formula Renault 2.0 Northern European Cup, the team joined the new series with Dennis Swart and Gwendolyn Hertzberger, who had only episodic point-scoring finishes.

Bruins Choi was retained for the 2007, while Muermans was replaced by Carlo van Dam. The Dutch driver dominated the season, winning eleven races. He gave the team the first drivers' F3 title since Leinders. And with the two wins of Bruins Choi it mean that the drivers of the team won 13 from 18 races. In the NEC series the team retained Swart, who was joined by Stef Dusseldorp. Despite missing last three rounds of the season Dusseldorp outscored more experienced teammate.

For 2008 Rahel Frey and Laurens Vanthoor joined the team. Vanthoor had two wins with another six podiums. Also the team expanded to compete in 2008 ADAC Formel Masters with Emma Kimiläinen. She had one podium and finished the season in the top-ten of the driver standings. Dusseldorp continued to race for the team in the Northern European Cup, while Nigel Melker joined him in the team. Dusseldorp won the first race for the team in the series.

Vanthoor remained with the team in 2009, Dusseldorp was promoted from the NEC series and became Vanthoor's teammate. The team repeated the success of 2007, with eleven wins and a championship title for Vanthoor and two wins for Dusseldorp. In ADAC Formel Masters the team like in 2008 had only one driver Christian Wangard, who have competed in more than two thirds of the races. And like in 2008, Van Amersfoort's driver had one podium with the tenth place in the season standings. It was the last year of operation in the ADAC Formel Masters for the team, as the team decided to concentrate on the German F3 Championship. In the NEC series the team was presented by Mathijs Harkema, who finished just eighteenth.

In 2010 the team expanded to three cars in German F3, Dusseldorp remained with Daniel Abt and Willi Steindl were the new additions to the squad. Despite his Formula 3 debut Abt was more successful than Dusseldorp. With wins at Assen and Oschersleben he was a title contender till the last race when he was forced to retire due to a broken lambda sensor. Dusseldorp and Steindl were also the race winners but weren't consistent as Abt. Jeroen Mul and Liroy Stuart were the team drivers in the Northern European Cup. Mul won two races at Zandvoort and Oschersleben.

The team completely changed their driver line-up in 2011. Richie Stanaway, Jeroen Mul and Hannes van Asseldonk signed with the team. Stanaway had more wins during the season in the German F3 than any driver in the Van Amersfoort Racing history, taking 13 wins from 18 races and the championship title. The team participated in the NEC series with Dennis van de Laar and Meindert van Buuren. Van de Laar finished the season eighth with ten top-ten finishes, while van Buuren was only 21st with four top-ten finishes.

For 2012 the team again reshuffled their line-up. Lucas Auer, René Binder and Dennis van de Laar became the new drivers. Auer and Binder were the race winners, but they were beaten by Motopark driver Jimmy Eriksson. 2012 was the last season for the team in the Northern European Cup, where the team was presented by Jeroen Slaghekke and Roman Beregech. Slaghekke won the race and finished fourth in the series standings. Beregech wasn't consistent and competitive as Slaghekke, so finished only 29th.

FIA Formula 3 European Championship (2012-2018)
After two races in 2012 with Auer and van de Laar, the team moved to the FIA Formula 3 European Championship on the full-time basis in 2013. They kept van de Laar and signed Måns Grenhagen. The team had tough start, with just one podium finish of Sven Müller, who took Grenhagen's car for the last three rounds of the season. The team remained in the German F3 with Gustavo Menezes and Jordi Weckx as their drivers. Both of them wasn't able to give the fight to Lotus drivers, who occupied the top step of the podium in the races with the full-points distribution.

2014 was the last year of the German Formula Three Championship, Sam MacLeod and Weiron Tan were the teams' drivers. But once again they were overscored by Lotus drivers Markus Pommer and Nabil Jeffri. While in the European Championship the team signed with Gustavo Menezes, Jules Szymkowiak and Max Verstappen. Verstappen, who made his Single-seaters debut in the championship, had the longest winning streak in the championship with six consecutive wins, that he scored at Spa and Norisring. He finished the season in third place with 10 wins, one more than champion Esteban Ocon.

For 2015 the team signed Charles Leclerc, Alessio Lorandi and Arjun Maini. Leclerc was the only driver who had race wins and finished the season in top-five of the standings. The team also expanded to the new-for-2015 ADAC Formula 4. Harrison Newey, Joey Mawson and Mick Schumacher were the team drivers. Mawson had five race wins and finished the season third, while Schumacher had one race win and completed the top-ten in the standings.

The team completely changed their line-up in the 2016 FIA Formula 3 European Championship with signing of Anthoine Hubert, Callum Ilott, Harrison Newey and Pedro Piquet. Ilott and Hubert were the only race winners for the squad. The team retained Mawson in ADAC F4, while Schumacher moved to another team. They had a championship battle, which was won by Mawson. But in the teams' championship Van Amersfoort Racing lost just by 4.5 points to Prema Powerteam.

In 2017 the team remained in the European Championship with Newey and Piquet, adding to their squad David Beckmann and the ADAC F4 champion Mawson. It was the worst season in the championship for the team as none of drivers have visited the top step of the podium and they were last in the teams standings. Their drivers for the 2017 ADAC Formula 4 Championship were Felipe Drugovich, Kami Laliberté, Frederik Vesti and Louis Gachot. Drugovich was the title contender till the last race of the season, but lost the battle to Prema drivers Jüri Vips and Marcus Armstrong. The team title was again claimed by Prema, who outscored Van Amersfoort Racing by 71 points.

For the final 2018 FIA Formula 3 European Championship campaign, the Dutch team signed with Keyvan Andres and Artem Petrov, with Sophia Flörsch a later addition to the team. While in 2018 ADAC Formula 4 Championship the squad were represented by Joey Alders, Liam Lawson, Lucas Alecco Roy, Frederik Vesti and Charles Weerts, with Lawson finishing runner-up in the championship.

Formula European Masters and Formula 4 (since 2019)
In 2019, Van Amersfoort committed to the inaugural Formula European Masters championship, reuniting with Flörsch. For the ADAC Formula 4 championship, the team reunited with Roy and signed Ido Cohen, Niklas Krütten, Sebastian Estner and Red Bull Junior Dennis Hauger. Following the cancellation of the Formula European Masters championship, Van Amersfoort entered the inaugural Formula Regional European Championship with Flörsch. Hauger ended up winning the 2019 Italian F4 Championship, 136 points in front of the nearest competitor, thereby helping Van Amersfoort to win the team championship. The Norwegian driver also finished second in ADAC F4, only seven points behind Théo Pourchaire.

FIA Formula 2 and Formula 3
In late 2021, it was announced VAR would replace HWA Racelab on the FIA Formula 2 and FIA Formula 3 grids from 2022 onwards.

Current series results

FIA Formula 2 Championship

In detail
(key) (Races in bold indicate pole position) (Races in italics indicate fastest lap)

* Season still in progress.

FIA Formula 3 Championship

In detail
(key) (Races in bold indicate pole position) (Races in italics indicate fastest lap)

* Season still in progress.

Formula Regional European Championship

In detail 
(key) (Races in bold indicate pole position) (Races in italics indicate fastest lap)

Italian F4 Championship

 D.C. = Drivers' Championship position, T.C. = Teams' Championship position.
† Ineligible for the position in the championship
1 Italian F4 Trophy
*Shared results with other team

F4 Spanish Championship

Formula 4 UAE Championship

Formula Regional Middle East Championship

Former series results

German Formula Three Championship

†Shared results with the other team

Formula Renault 2.0 Northern European Cup

ADAC Formel Masters

FIA European Formula 3 Championship

†Shared results with the other team

Euroformula Open Championship

ADAC Formula 4

‡Shared results with the other team(s)

† Ineligible for the position in the championship

Timeline

Notes

References

External links 

 

Dutch auto racing teams
FIA Formula 2 Championship teams
FIA Formula 3 Championship teams
Formula Renault Eurocup teams
Formula 3 Euro Series teams
FIA Formula 3 European Championship teams
British Formula Three teams
German Formula 3 teams
ADAC Formula 4
Euroformula Open Championship teams
Auto racing teams established in 1975
1975 establishments in the Netherlands
Formula Regional European Championship teams